Jump Associates is a strategy and innovation consulting firm with offices in San Mateo, CA and New York, NY. The company was founded in 1998 by CEO Dev Patnaik, Udaya Patnaik, Neal Moore, and Robert Becker. Its business was launched with a project for the office furniture company Steelcase, which continued to be a client in years to come.
Since its founding, Jump has grown to a 50-person, multimillion-dollar company.

Approach and methods 
Jump Associates takes what it has termed a “hybrid thinking” approach to business strategy, with the goal of helping clients to identify new markets, develop new sources of revenue, and reinvent existing categories. Jump believes that this hybrid approach at the intersection of organizational culture, design thinking and business allows them to take a broader view of issues and find new opportunities that might otherwise be missed.

Underlying the hybrid thinking approach is an emphasis on using empathy to help companies better understand what's going on in the world. In the book “Wired to Care,” Patnaik discusses customer empathy and how “the ‘needsfinding’ exercises that industrial designers do that seem so focused on objects and products are really about people and empathy.”  Patnaik contends that empathy for customers enables companies to create offerings that are more likely to succeed by aligning their work directly with people’s needs.

Jump’s work is built on the premise that creativity is an expertise, and it is possible to create conditions for cultivating innovative ideas and be trained to brainstorm. The firm uses a variety of methods including improv-inspired brainstorming, anthropological analysis of video footage of target users, and mock business pitches. The company also relies on neuroscience and the latest team-building research and methods to improve effectiveness and camaraderie. For example, new employees take learning and skills-assessment tests, which are used and talked about on a regular basis to improve team performance.

Services and offerings 
Jump’s services encompass various ways to approach brainstorming and generating ideas to solve what they term “ambiguous problems,” combining elements of management consulting, design, and selling “the art of innovation.” Organizations may hire Jump to “think on [their] behalf,” or hire Jump to teach them how to generate better ideas through a series of training sessions.

The “ambiguous problems” Jump has helped companies to solve include helping P&G study the future of water, and working with Target to reframe its back-to-school lines by focusing on students’ mindsets and hopes rather than specific product trends.

Jump serves clients in various industries, including but not limited to high tech, consumer packaged goods, retail, hospitality, and travel, and has specialized practices in healthcare and financial services. Its clients have included GE, Samsung, Target, FedEx, 3M, Nike, HP, Harley Davidson, General Mills, NBC, Sony, and Stanford Medical Center. Jump's collaboration with the Stanford School of Medicine on helping its medical staff achieve work-life balance won the Alfred P. Sloan Award for Excellence in Faculty Career Flexibility. The work involved conducting video ethnographies and interviews of academic doctors and other staff.

Organization and culture 
Jump's organizational culture emphasizes teamwork and “considerate collaboration” in service of creativity. For example, all employees, known as “Jumpsters,” meet every morning for a standing meeting called a “scrum,” a quick get-together to share company news and updates, yoga-like exercises, and brain-stimulating games. Jump employees occasionally do “affinity exercises,” where employees ask their coworkers to say one thing they like about each other. There is also a “no zinger” policy banning Jumpsters from making demeaning or hurtful comments about other employees. Jump occasionally uses a coach to help employees with any teamwork issues, such as improving communications or conflict resolution. As part of the collaborative culture, all employees, including senior management, sit in open “neighborhoods” of five or six workers. Jump also emphasizes injecting energy, whether that's for employees, clients, or any visitors.

The Jump office, or “JumpSpace,” was designed with Michael Fazio of the architecture firm Archideas to foster creativity and encourage employees to bounce ideas off of each other. The office includes various forms of workspaces to account for different working styles and promote informal social interaction, including a café, an open staircase, zen room, and a performance space with a garage door. The office has a flexible infrastructure for people to easily move walls, desks, and whiteboards as needed.

In 2008, Jump Associates was recognized as one of the Top Small Workplaces by the Wall Street Journal.

References

External links 
 Jump Associates Web Site
 Jump articles on Forbes
 Wired To Care book official site

1998 establishments in California
Privately held companies based in California
Consulting firms established in 1998
Companies based in San Mateo, California
Design companies of the United States